FGM stands for female genital mutilation, the removal of some or all of the external female genitalia for non-medical reasons.

FGM may also refer to:

 Fisher's geometric model, an evolutionary model
 Flamelet generated manifold, a chemistry reduction technique
 Flux-gate magnetometer, a measuring instrument
 Functionally graded material, in materials science
 Free Gaza Movement
 Flash Glucose Monitoring, a method to measure blood glucose level in people with diabetes.

See also
 FGM-77, the development name for the M47 Dragon anti-tank missile
 FGM-148 Javelin, an anti-tank missile
 FGM-172 SRAW, a short-range assault weapon